The Syrian National Youth Party is a political party that was approved on 14 March 2012 following the Syrian constitutional referendum, 2012 that introduced multi party elections into Syria. It describes itself as neither "pro- or anti-government" but says while it "opposes wrongdoing", it functions "under the umbrella of Syria, the homeland, and President Bashar al-Assad" 

It fielded three candidates in Damascus Governorate in the Syrian parliamentary election, 2012, although contested the results, claiming that the vote had been marred by irregularities and fraud. As a result, the party rejected the election results and proclaimed the new parliament illegitimate.

The secretary-general is Nabil Merhaj and the co-founder and spokesman is Maher Mirhej

References 

2012 establishments in Syria
Political parties established in 2012
Political parties in Syria